Matt Ignatius Sullivan (November 3, 1857 – August 6, 1937) was the 16th Chief Justice of California. Appointed by Governor Hiram Johnson, Sullivan served from August 22, 1914, to January 4, 1915.

Biography
Sullivan was born in Grass Valley, California, one of eight children of Michael M. and Margaret Sullivan. In 1863, the family moved to the Mission District of San Francisco. He attended public and parochial schools, graduating with an A.B. degree from St. Ignatius College (later named University of San Francisco). He then studied law at University of California, Hastings College of the Law in the first class, though he left in November 1879 without graduating. He continued reading law with his older brother, Jeremiah F. Sullivan, who also served as a judge of the San Francisco County Superior Court and on the California Supreme Court (the only instance where siblings have served on that court).

In 1879, Sullivan was admitted to the Bar, became known as a skilled trial attorney, and in 1889 joined his brother in the firm of Sullivan & Sullivan. By 1912, San Francisco Police Commissioner Theodore J. Roche joined the law firm, re-named Sullivan, Sullivan & Roche. Sullivan rose to prominence in the aftermath of the 1906 San Francisco earthquake when he and childhood friend, James Rolph, Jr., set up emergency aid stations in the neighborhoods. Afterwards, Sullivan and Senator Hiram Johnson prosecuted the famous post-fire bribe and graft case against San Francisco supervisor, Abe Ruef. In July 1913, Sullivan was appointed a special prosecutor with the United States Attorney's Office. When Johnson later became Governor, he appointed Sullivan to the Supreme Court in September 1914. On November 3, 1914, Sullivan was elected for the remainder of the short term expiring January 4, 1915. 

After stepping down from the bench, Sullivan resumed private practice, remained active in politics, and led a series of civic improvements. When his friend James Rolph became first Mayor of San Francisco from 1912 to 1931, and then Governor of California from 1931 until 1934, Sullivan served as a close political advisor.

Law school dean
From September 1912, Sullivan served as the first dean of the law school at St. Ignatius (University of San Francisco) until his death in 1937.

Personal life
A bachelor, he lived with his brother, John, and sister, Mary McCarthy.

References

External links
California Supreme Court Historical Society page for Matt I. Sullivan
 Past & Present Justices. California State Courts. Retrieved July 19, 2017.

See also
 List of justices of the Supreme Court of California

1857 births
1937 deaths
Chief Justices of California
Lawyers from San Francisco
University of San Francisco alumni
University of San Francisco faculty
U.S. state supreme court judges admitted to the practice of law by reading law